RK FM (Radio Kuwait) also known as (SuperStation) is a radio station located in Kuwait City, Kuwait.

The station is broadcast on the FM band at a frequency of 99.7 MHz.
 
Radio Kuwait 99.7 broadcasts music, news, information, talk and live shows. However, RK FM is primarily considered a music station.

The most common types of music played are hip hop, rock, and rap, which are based on American, British and some middle-east music creators.  

Radio stations in Kuwait
Mass media in Kuwait City